USS Poppy was a steamer commissioned by the Union Navy during the American Civil War.

She served the Navy during the blockade of ports and waterways of the Confederate States of America in a variety of ways: as a tugboat, a ship’s tender, a mail and supply tug, an ordnance tug, and finally as a ram if the opportunity presented itself.

Purchased at Philadelphia 

Poppy (Screw Tug), originally white oak steamer Addie Douglass, was purchased at Philadelphia 31 October 1863 from J. Alderdice; renamed Poppy; and commissioned 10 November 1863.

Civil War service 
 
During the Civil War, Poppy served as a ship's tender to the North Atlantic Blockading Squadron. On 4 February 1864 she was in Hampton Roads, Virginia. By 17 March she was back off Newport News, again serving as a picket guard for ironclad Roanoke.

On the night of 8 April a small boat succeeded in attacking frigate , flagship of the North Atlantic Blockading Squadron, with a torpedo, making a clean escape. Poppy was ordered to ram the intruder, but was unable to do so because her steam was not up.
 
Poppy was then used as mail and supply tug until 17 June when she was stationed in the James River above Wilson’s Wharf as a tender and ram to ironclads. Late in the year she became a tug in Hampton Roads and operated there and in the James River, becoming an ordnance tug at Norfolk, Virginia, in April 1865.

Post-war deactivation 

She was sold at New York City 30 November 1865 to William Farrington.

References  

Ships of the Union Navy
Steamships of the United States Navy
Tugs of the United States Navy
Tenders of the United States Navy
Dispatch boats of the United States Navy
Rams of the United States Navy
American Civil War auxiliary ships of the United States